Alomerović is a Bosnian surname, derived from the Arabic family name "al-Omari". It may refer to:

Fikret Alomerović (born 1970), Macedonian footballer
Kemal Alomerović (born 1980), Macedonian footballer
Zlatan Alomerović (born 1991), German footballer

Bosnian surnames